Saltenposten is a local online and print newspaper published in Fauske, Norway. It covers the municipalities of Fauske, Saltdal, Beiarn and Sørfold in inner Salten. Published in tabloid format, the newspaper had a circulation of 4,717 in 2013. The newspaper is independently owned. It has three weekly issues, on Tuesdays, Thursdays and Saturdays. The newspaper was founded in 1996.

References

1996 establishments in Norway
Fauske
Mass media in Nordland
Newspapers established in 1996
Newspapers published in Norway
Norwegian-language newspapers